This is a list of venues used for professional baseball in Indianapolis, Indiana. The information is a compilation of the information contained in the references listed.

South Street Park
Home of: Indianapolis – League Alliance (1877), National League (1878)
Location: Delaware Avenue (west); South Street (south); Alabama Street (east)
Currently: was Big Four freight houses; now parking lot for Gainbridge Fieldhouse, across the street to the west and northwest

Tinker Park aka Athletic Park aka Seventh Street Park
Home of:
Indianapolis – AA (1884) (weekdays) 
Indianapolis Hoosiers – NL (1887–1889) (weekdays)
Location: Tinker (later West Seventh, now West 16th) Street (south, third base); North Mississippi Street (now North Senate Avenue) (west, left field); North Tennessee Street (now North Capitol Avenue) (east, first base) 
Currently: Methodist Hospital of Indianapolis

Bruce Park
Home of:
Indianapolis – AA (1884) (Sundays only)
Indianapolis Hoosiers – NL (1887) (Sundays only)
Location: Bruce (now 23rd) Street; College Avenue
Currently: Residential and commercial

Indianapolis Park aka East Ohio Street Grounds aka League Park
Home of:
Indianapolis Hoosiers – NL (1888–1889) (Sundays only)
Indianapolis – Western Inter-State League (1890)
Indianapolis – Western League (1892, 1894–1899)
Location: New York Street (north); Arsenal Avenue (east); East Ohio Street (south); Hanna Street (renamed Oriental Street about 1898) (west) – near or within the former Noble's Pasture - near Market Street
Currently: Residential, commercial, school, church

Washington Park (I)
Home of:
Indianapolis Indians – AL (1900)
Indianapolis - Western Association 1901 (partial season)
Indianapolis - AA (1902–1904)
Location: 3001 East Washington Street (north); Gray Street (east); Christian Street (west) (approximates Parker Avenue); railroad tracks (south) – built from lumber at East Ohio Street park
Currently: Later site of Wonderland Amusement Park; now commercial, residential

Northwestern Park 
Home of Indianapolis ABCs – early Negro League baseball, early 1900s
Location: 17th Street (formerly Holton Place) (to the south, third base); Brighton Boulevard (replaced by Dr. MLK Jr. Street) (to the east, first base)
Currently: Indiana State Police Laboratory

Washington Park (II) 
Home of: 
Indianapolis Indians – AA (1905–1912), (1915 – mid-1931)
Indianapolis ABCs – Negro National League (1920–1926)
Location: 1205 West Washington Street (north); at about where Harding Avenue T's into Washington; opposite "car barns" and site of Indy Transit System [city directories place it between Brush and Lansing, which were a few short blocks east of the current Harding Avenue]; home plate in northwest corner
Currently: Indianapolis Zoo.

Riverside Beach or Riverside Park
Home of: Indianapolis Hoosiers - Federal League (1913)
Location: one source says "30th Street and Riverside Park"; another says "30th Street and the canal"

Federal League Park
Home of:
Indianapolis Hoosiers – FL (1914)
Location: "Kentucky Avenue and West Street"; Kentucky Avenue and railroad tracks (southeast, center field); Oliver Street (south, right field); White River (some distance west, first base); former Greenlawn Cemetery (north, third base); intersection of Kentucky, West and South Street (northeast, half a block away) – a block west of the site of Lucas Oil Stadium, and a block south of Victory Field II
Currently: Commercial

Bush Stadium originally Perry Stadium, then Victory Field (I)
Home of:
Indianapolis Indians – AA (mid-1931 – 1962), IL (1963), PCL (1964–1968), AA (1969 – mid-1996)
Indianapolis ABCs (II) – Negro leagues (1931–1933)
Indianapolis Clowns – Negro American League (1946–1950)
Location: 1501 West 16th Street – 16th Street (north, left field); Harding Street (east, right field); parking, buildings and Riverside Drive (west, third base); Waterway Boulevard and White River (south, first base)
Currently: Has been converted to housing units called Stadium Lofts.

Victory Field (II)
Home of: Indianapolis Indians – AA (mid-1996–1997), IL (1998–present)
Location: 501 West Maryland Street – Maryland Street (north, left field); Maryland Street / Washington Street (west, third base); West Street (east, right field);

See also 
Lists of baseball parks
Sports in Indianapolis

References 

 Peter Filichia, Professional Baseball Franchises, Facts on File, 1993.
 
 
 The Federal League of 1914–1915, by Marc Okkonen, SABR, 1989.
 Polk City Directories

External links 
 Writeup and postcard photo of Washington Park (I)
 Sanborn map showing a portion of Northwestern Park, 1915

Indianapolis
 
Sports venues in Indianapolis
baseball parks